The 1993 Campeonato Paulista de Futebol Profissional da Primeira Divisão - Série A1 was the 92nd season of São Paulo's top professional football league. Palmeiras  won the championship by the 19th time. Fourteen teams were relegated.

Championship
The thirty teams of the championship were divided into two groups, Group A, one with sixteen teams (the ten best teams of Group A and the six best teams of Group B in the previous year) and Group B, with fourteen (the bottom four of Group A, the other teams of Group B and the two teams that had been promoted from the second level). Every team played twice against the teams of its own group, and the six best teams of Group A and the two best teams of Group B qualified to the Second phase. However, in that year, the championship was slated to be reduced to sixteen teams, and as such, the four bottom teams of Group A and the ten bottom teams of Group B were relegated to the Second Level.

The Second phase's eight teams were divided into two groups of four, with every team playing twice against the teams of its own group and the winners of each group qualifying to the Finals.

First phase

Group A

Group B

Second phase

Group 1

Group 2

Finals

|}

References

Campeonato Paulista seasons
Paulista